The Esscher principle is an insurance premium principle. This premium is the net premium for a risk , where  denotes the moment generating function.

The Esscher principle is a risk measure used in actuarial sciences that derives from the Esscher transform.

References

Actuarial science